Hira Vallabh Tripathi (1902–1982) was an Indian politician. He was a Member of Parliament, representing Uttar Pradesh in the Rajya Sabha the upper house of India's Parliament representing the Indian National Congress.

References

External links
 Official Biographical Sketch in Lok Sabha Website

1902 births
1982 deaths
Indian National Congress politicians
Rajya Sabha members from Uttar Pradesh
People from Muzaffarnagar